Kristina Louise Moore is a Jersey politician and former journalist who is currently the Chief Minister of Jersey, as well as being a Deputy for St Mary, St Ouen and St Peter.

She has served in the States Assembly since  2011 and is currently a deputy for  St Mary,  St Ouen and  St Peter. First serving as Deputy for St Peter, she was Minister for Home Affairs from 2014 to 2018. In  2018 she was elected as a senator and became Chair of the Corporate Services Scrutiny Panel.

In 2022, she was elected by the new States Assembly as the first female Chief Minister of Jersey, a role which she officially took on 12 July that year.

Before entering politics she worked for ITV Central in the UK and ITV Channel Television in Jersey.

Journalism
Before her election to the States Assembly in 2011, Moore spent over ten years working as a broadcast journalist based in the Channel Islands and the UK and presented Channel Television's nightly regional news programme, Channel Report.

After completing a BA in French at the University of Birmingham and a postgraduate diploma in broadcast journalism at Highbury College, Moore worked in news departments for independent local radio stations in the South of England. For a few years, she worked for ITV Central in Nottingham as a reporter and newsreader for Central News East.

In 2000, she joined Channel Television as a news reporter, before going on to replace Jenny Kirk as a main anchor of Channel Report and taking up a role as a political correspondent. She also spent a short period working for BBC Spotlight in the Channel Islands.

Political career
Moore stood for St Peter's sole deputy seat in the 2011 general election for the States Assembly. She was elected on 19 October 2011, defeating Wayne Le Marquand by 1,169 votes to 589.

In her 2011 manifesto, she stated that she would resist any further increases in Jersey's Goods and Services Tax (GST), and would like to see the proposed reduction in the number of States Members carried out by 2014. At this time in 2011, the GST rate was 5%, having been increased from 3% in June 2011.

On 15 October 2014, Moore was re-elected as deputy, defeating Debbie Hardisty by 1,335 votes to 200. Between 2014 and 2018, during Ian Gorst's second term as Chief Minister, she served as Minister for Home Affairs – the minister responsible for public safety, law enforcement, emergency services and immigration. Her Assistant Minister was Deidre Mezbourian,  Connétable of  Saint Lawrence. One notable law introduced during Moore's tenure was the Sexual Offences (Jersey) Law 2018, which strengthened protections for islanders (particularly children) against sexual offences, and for the first time introduced protection against female genital mutilation.

In 2018, Moore announced that she would stand for senator in the upcoming general election. She was elected senator on 16 May 2018, coming second out of the seventeen candidates standing for the eight senator positions. She received 15,292 votes, only narrowly beaten by Tracey Vallois who received 15,518 votes. In the preceding election for  Chief Minister, she supported the incumbent, Senator Ian Gorst, who lost to Senator John Le Fondré. Moore left Government, and took up positions on various scrutiny panels, most prominently as Chair of the Corporate Services Panel and President of the Scrutiny Liaison Committee.

In November 2020, Moore lodged a  vote of no confidence in Chief Minister John Le Fondré, over a scandal involving the Government of Jersey Chief Executive Charlie Parker being allowed to take up a  non-executive directorship as a second job.

In the  2022 general election she was elected deputy for St. Mary, St. Ouen and St. Peter, after the role of senator was abolished. On 5 July 2022 she was elected Chief Minister by the States Assembly. She received 39 votes, with  Deputy Sam Mezec of Reform Jersey receiving 10 votes. She assumed office on 12 July.

References

External links

MOORE, Kristina Louise on vote.je

Year of birth missing (living people)
Living people
21st-century British women politicians
British women television journalists
Chief Ministers of Jersey
Deputies of Jersey
ITV regional newsreaders and journalists
Jersey journalists
Jersey women in politics
Alumni of the University of Birmingham